The Annales Henri Poincaré (A Journal of Theoretical and Mathematical Physics) is a peer-reviewed scientific journal which collects and publishes original research papers in the field  of theoretical and mathematical physics. The emphasis is on "analytical theoretical and mathematical physics" in a broad sense. The journal is named in honor of Henri Poincaré and it succeeds two former journals, Annales de l'Institut Henri Poincaré, physique théorique and Helvetica Physical Acta. It is published by Birkhäuser Verlag. Its first Chief Editor was Vincent Rivasseau, followed by Krzysztof Gawedzki, and the current Chief Editor is Claude-Alain Pillet.

Abstracting and indexing
According to the Journal Citation Reports, the journal had a 2020 impact factor of 1.550. The journal is published as one volume of 12 issues per year and is abstracted or indexed in the following databases: Academic OneFile, Academic Search, Current Abstracts, Current Contents/Physical, Chemical and Earth Sciences, Digital Mathematics Registry, Gale, Google Scholar, Inspec, Journal Citation Reports/Science Edition, Mathematical Reviews, OCLC, Science Citation Index, Science Citation Index Expanded (SciSearch), SCOPUS, Summon by Serial Solutions, TOC Premier, VINITI - Russian Academy of Science, Zentralblatt Math

See also
 Institut Henri Poincaré

References

External links
 SpringerLink: Annales Henri Poincaré (2000–) 
 Annales de l'Institut Henri Poincaré (1930–1964) 
  Annales de l'Institut Henri Poincaré A: Theoretical Physics (1964–1999) 
 Annales de l'Institut Henri Poincaré B: Probability and Statistics (1964–2000) 
 Annales de l'Institut Henri Poincaré C: Analyse Non Linéaire (1983–) 
 Annales de l'Institut Henri Poincaré D: Combinatorics, Physics and their Interactions (2014–) 

Mathematics journals
Physics journals
Publications established in 2000
Springer Science+Business Media academic journals